Eurydice was one of the Greek language women's magazines published in Istanbul, Ottoman Empire. It did not only featured women-related articles but also those on Greek Orthodox identity and Greek nationalism. The magazine was in circulation between 1870 and 1873.

History and profile
Eurydice was first published on 21 November 1870. It was published and edited by Emilia Ktena Leontias who was a school teacher and the sister of Sappho Leontias. The frequency of the magazine varied. It was published on a weekly basis between its start on 21 November 1870 and 24 March 1871. Then it appeared every five days between 14 April 1871 and 30 October 1871. Next the magazine published biweekly from 15 January 1872 to 20 October 1872 and from 8 March 1873 to 30 May 1873. Page number of Eurydice was not also standard and varied between eight pages and twenty-four pages. The magazine folded with the issue dated 30 May 1873 after producing a total of 76 issues.

Content
Eurydice  had a moderate approach towards women-related issues. The magazine mostly reflected the views of Sappho Leontias concerning the connections between women question and Greek nationalism. Leontias argued that the woman was destined to live not for herself, but for the others living in the same society and the nation. Eurydice also advocated the Greek Orthodox identity.

References

1870 establishments in the Ottoman Empire
1873 disestablishments in the Ottoman Empire
Defunct political magazines published in Turkey
Magazines established in 1870
Magazines disestablished in 1873
Magazines published in Istanbul
Greek-language magazines
Women's magazines published in Turkey
Greek nationalism
Weekly magazines published in Turkey
Biweekly magazines